The 1946 Marshall Thundering Herd football team was an American football team that represented Marshall University as a member of the West Virginia Intercollegiate Athletic Conference (WVIAC) during the 1946 college football season. In its ninth season under head coach Cam Henderson, the team compiled a 2–7–1 record and was outscored by a total of 190 to 145. Jack Chapman and Don Gibson were the team captains.

Schedule

References

Marshall
Marshall Thundering Herd football seasons
Marshall Thundering Herd football